Cosmisoma rhaptos is a species of beetle in the family Cerambycidae. It was described by Giesbert & Chemsak in 1993.

References

Cosmisoma
Beetles described in 1993